JGP may refer to:
 ISU Junior Grand Prix, a figure skating competition
 Japanese Grand Prix, a Formula One automobile race
 The Journal of General Physiology
 Jean-Gabriel Pageau, a Canadian ice hockey player